SGS Genesis (previously SectCAD, BlkCAD, PolyCAD, Geostat) is the fruit of more than 30 years of expertise in software development for the modelling of mineral resources. Indeed, in 1981, SGS S.A., formerly Gamma Geostat International Inc. was among the pioneers in computer based geostatistical methods and had created one of the first geological modeling software for the first generation of supercomputers (CDC Cyber mainframe). This software is used by SGS Canada Inc., among other things, for the production of National Instrument 43-101 reports in requirement with the Canadian securities regulation. Genesis offers all the tools necessary so that mineral resources are estimated in accordance with the rules of art in conformity with generally accepted CIM Estimation of Mineral Resource and Mineral Reserve Best Practices Guidelines.

The first programs were developed by one of the company founders, Michel David, Professor of Geostatistics at École Polytechnique of Montréal and Fellow of the Academy of Science of the Royal Society of Canada. He has established the first regular courses in geostatistics for future mining engineers and geologists in the Americas.

A brief outline of the methodology 

Genesis allows modeling with a legacy sectional method using polygons (longitudinal polygons and polygons by benches) following the previously modelized mineralized intervals in drill holes as well as the modern modelling using the creation of meshed envelopes by connecting polygons or using implicit modelling.

The resource estimate can then be performed by rapid and traditional methods like the grade of a prism given by the average grade of the mineralized intervals weighted by their intersecting lengths. The grade of a figure given by the  average grade of the prisms weighted by  the volume of the intersections. Or by using the polygonal method using the decomposition of a polygon in several Voronoi polygons having each the grade and the projected thickness of their composite.

It is also possible to use an estimation by block models using several methods for estimating from  the inverse of the square of the distance to more sophisticated as kriging or conditional simulation. Powerful tools for automatically generating statistical charts, variable ellipsoids or QKNA  help the estimators to produce an efficient estimation  and ensure his quality.

A free drill holes and model viewer 

The demo version can open drill holes (boreholes) from csv files or SGS-GeoBase to visualize 3D hole traces with associated data. Surfaces, 3D envelopes, data points (composites), lines and polygons and also block models can be also  imported. Since June 2017, the logging software SGS-Geobase is free under GPL licence.

See also 
Geologic modelling
Geostatistics
Mineral resource estimation
Mineral resource classification
Mineral exploration
Exploration logging
Well logging
Economic geology
National Instrument 43-101

References

External links
Genesis website

Geology software
Methodology